In 1063, at the Synod of Jaca, under the auspices of King Ramiro I of Aragon and the presidency of the Archbishop of Auch, the ancient diocese of Huesca, whose seat was under Muslim Zaragozan control, was reestablished in the town of Jaca, which became "an instant city". Besides the archbishop of Auch, Austind, the synod was attended by other prelates of Gascony, Navarre and Aragon. Much of Jaca's early settlers were Gascons at this time. The synod determined the boundaries of the diocese, both present and future, that is, after its reconquista. Much of the new territory was taken at the expense of the diocese of Roda, whose bishop, Raymond, later litigated over Alquézar. It placed the canons of Jaca under the Augustinian Rule, and also introduced that rule into the royal chapels of Siresa, Loarre, Montearagón and Alquézar. Unspecified reform was introduced into the monasteries of San Juan de la Peña and San Victorián de Huesca, and the Roman rite replaced the old Visigothic liturgy. A new, eclectic cathedral, San Pedro Apóstol, was consecrated in Jaca.

At the synod, the king of Aragon promised the church of Jaca a thirtieth of all royal revenue from Christian and Muslim tributaries (tributarii), which at the time included the parias from Zaragoza and Tudela:
We also give and concede to God and the blessed fisherman [Peter] a tenth of all our own gold, silver, grain and wine, as well as, among other things, whatever our tributaries, either freely or by force, give to us, both Christian and Saracen, from all the villages and castles in the mountains and the plains within prescribed boundaries ... In addition, from one of the tributes that we either receive presently or should receive in the future, by God's mercy, from Zaragoza and Tudela, we concede and donate a third part of the tenth of it to the aforementioned church and bishop.
Shortly after the synod, Ramiro went on campaign and died at the battle of Graus (3 May).

The authenticity of the council's acta, the principal source for the event, has been questioned by Antonio Durán Gudiol, who by extension has questioned the existence of the council itself. The acta are preserved in fifteen copies in the archives of the cathedrals of Jaca and Santa María de Huesca, several of them of high artistic value (de alto valor artístico). Durán Gudiol argues that the "acta" are in fact a heavily redacted record of a grant by the king and his son, Sancho, to the church of Jaca.

Attendees
The following is a list of known attendees who confirmed the acta: 
King Ramiro I of Aragon
Archbishop Austind of Auch
Bishop Guillem Guifré of Urgell
Bishop Heraclius I of Tarbes
Bishop Stephen of Oloron
Bishop Gomesano of Calahorra
Bishop John II of Pamplona
Bishop Sancho of Huesca, whose see was being transferred to Jaca
Bishop Paterno of Zaragoza
Bishop Arnulf I of Roda.
Abbot Blasco of San Juan de la Peña
Abbot Banzo of San Andrés de Fanio
Abbot Garuso of San Victorián de Huesca
Infante Sancho Ramírez, the king's legitimate son (infante) and heir
Count Sancho Ramírez, the king's illegitimate son
Count Sancho Galíndez
Fortuño Sánchez
Lope Garcés
some nutriti aule regie, noble youths raised at the royal court

Notes

Sources

 [Originally published in Cuadernos de Historia de España 47 (1968): 31–135 and 48 (1969): 30–116.]

1063 in Europe
Jaca,1063
Province of Huesca
11th century in Aragon